Cymothoe distincta is a butterfly in the family Nymphalidae. It is found in Cameroon, the Republic of the Congo, the Democratic Republic of the Congo and Uganda.

Subspecies
Cymothoe distincta distincta (Cameroon, Congo, Democratic Republic of the Congo)
Cymothoe distincta kivuensis Overlaet, 1952 (Democratic Republic of the Congo: Kivu, Uganda: west to the Bwamba Valley)

References

Butterflies described in 1944
Cymothoe (butterfly)